Ch'apini (Aymara jach'a big, ch'api thorn, -ni a suffix, "the big one with thorns", also spelled Chapini) is a  mountain in the Bolivian Andes. It is located in the La Paz Department, Loayza Province, Luribay Municipality. Ch'apini lies at the Luribay River, southeast of Jach'a Ch'apini ("big Ch'apini").

References 

Mountains of La Paz Department (Bolivia)